Katipalla is a small town, five km from Surathkal in the Dakshina Kannada district of Karnataka state, India. The language most spoken in this area is Tulu. And muslims speaks here byari language.byari

Overview 
Many residents of this place were rehabilitated from Panambur, after the New Mangalore Port Trust ( NMPT ).
"Katipalla" in local Tulu language literally means wild stream. 'Kati' means wild, 'palla' means stream. A stream originates from this place and flows downtoward towards the Krishnapura Matha and further down joining other streams. Before rehabilitation during the 1970s, the area was covered with forest infested with wild animals like tiger, hyena, fox etc. Perhaps name of this place may have derived because the wild animals used this water stream to quench their thirst. Here the population is mixed with three main religions Hindu, Muslim, & Christians.

Furthermore, Krishnapura Matha is one of Ashta Mathas of Udupi founded by Dvaita philosopher Sri Madhvacharya. Some of the area (blocks) of Katipalla are even today known as Krishnapura, especially those near to Krishnapura matha. The Krishnapura Matha has a Mukhyaprana (Maruti or Hanuman) temple inside. The structure of the Matha is supported by wood pillars. The Matha has exquisite wooden carving. The Mangalore petroleum refinery (MRPL) and BASF plant are also nearby.

Important information 
Pincode : 575030 (It was previously 574149).
Here We can see a beautiful Church. INFANT MARY CHURCH.

And there is a masjid named MUHIYUDDEEN JUMA MASJID KATIPALLA (PMJK) near 2nd block katipalla junction. The junction is named as shamsuddeen circle

How to reach Katipalla 
There are many city buses starting from State Bank ( Heart of Mangalore ) to Katipalla. The frequency of buses are good. Most of these buses come to Katipalla via Surathkal. The route numbers are as follows 45,45C,45D,45H
The last bus stop for 45, 45A is Katipalla Shamsuddin Circle.
and for 45C Katipalla Kaikamba near Ganapati Temple at Ganeshapura.

External links
Church of Katipalla
Ganesha Temple Katipalla

Cities and towns in Dakshina Kannada district